Canuto Senen "Tito" Adriano Oreta (July 30, 1939 – September 3, 2012) was a Filipino politician who was Mayor of Malabon.

Early life
Born Canuto Senen Adriano Oreta on July 30, 1939 in Barangay Maysilo, Malabon, Metro Manila. He was the second of five siblings: Celia, Charito (with her husband Jaime), Antolin Jr. "Len" (with his wife Tessie Aquino-Oreta) Eddy and Tony.

Personal life

Family
He was married to Maria Aranzazu "Aring" Dionisio-Oreta and had 5 children:
Gerardo "Dondi" D. Oreta & Marie Antonette "Tonet" Gatchalian-Oreta, with 2 daughters: Patricia & Amanda
Maria Agnes "Nina" Oreta-Hewitt & Carl Hewitt,                                        and daughter Sadie
Victor Antolin "Vic" D. Oreta & Ma. Cecilia "Cecile" Solidum-Oreta, with 2 children: Michelle & Miguel
Ramon D. Oreta & Jennifer Yu, and son Logan
Paulo Alberto D. Oreta & Cindy Tan-Oreta, with 3 children: Nicole, PJ and Pauline

He was the brother-in-law of former Senator Tessie Aquino-Oreta.

Educational life
Elementary: St. James Academy, Malabon (1944-1951)
High School: University of the Philippines Integrated School, Quezon City (1951-1955)
College: Mapúa Institute of Technology, Intramuros, Manila (1955-1960)
Others: Armed Forces of the Philippines - Home Defense Training (1976 & 1977), Jungle Warfare Mountain Operation/Ranger Course (1987), Passer of the Board Examination For Civil Engineers in July 1969

Political life
Before becoming the Malabon Mayor, he served as the Barangay Captain of Maysilo for several terms. Barangay Maysilo bestowed upon him the honor of being their Outstanding Barangay Captain in 1989. And then, the CAMANAVA Press Corps recognized him as 1994 Outstanding Barangay Captain in the North Sector of Metropolitan Manila. For three consecutive terms, he was elected as President of Malabon Association of Barangay Captains, which automatically called him as City Councilor to the Sangguniang Panlungsod ng Malabon.

He ran for mayor in 2004 and won under the Nationalist People’s Coalition banner. He won a second and third term in 2007 and 2010, respectively, unopposed for the last 2 terms.

Death
Oreta died at 10:00 AM on September 3, 2012, after a battle with lung cancer, news reports said. Oreta died of “multiple organ failure”, at the St. Luke's Medical Center in Quezon City. He was 73 years old. The remains of Mayor Tito Oreta was transferred from his Maysilo residence to the Malabon City Hall on September 7, 10:00 AM. A mass was held at the Malabon Amphitheater at 8PM followed by a necrological ceremony. The last Mass was held at San Bartolome Church at 9:00 AM. His remains were then cremated and interred on September 8, 2012 at the Loyola Memorial Park in Marikina. Meanwhile, vice mayor Antolin Oreta III, better known as Len-len Oreta, succeeded him as the Acting City Mayor of Malabon.

References

1939 births
2012 deaths
People from Malabon
Metro Manila city and municipal councilors
Mayors of Malabon
Mapúa University alumni
Lakas–CMD (1991) politicians
Deaths from lung cancer in the Philippines
Deaths from multiple organ failure
Lakas–CMD politicians
Filipino Roman Catholics
Burials at the Loyola Memorial Park